Szemere is a village in , Hungary.

References

External links 
 Street map 

Populated places in Borsod-Abaúj-Zemplén County